Miche Wabun Glacier is a glacier remnant (glacieret) in the U.S. state of Montana in the northeastern region of Glacier National Park. The glacieret is situated in a cirque to the east of Goat Haunt Mountain. Between 1966 and 2005, the glacier lost over 55 percent of its surface area.

See also
 List of glaciers in the United States
 Glaciers in Glacier National Park (U.S.)

References

Glaciers of Glacier County, Montana
Glaciers of Glacier National Park (U.S.)
Glaciers of Montana